LS5 Radio Rivadavia is a radio station which broadcasts from Buenos Aires, Argentina. Founded in 1928, it broadcasts 24 hours a day since 1959, and carries a full service format. Its slogan is Estamos donde tenemos que estar... de tu lado (Spanish for "We're right where we have to be... by your side").

Radio stations in Argentina
Mass media in Buenos Aires